The Bunga Mas Lima class is a class of auxiliary ships in service with the Royal Malaysian Navy (RMN). The class comprises two ships: KA Bunga Mas Lima and KA Bunga Mas Enam.

Development
KA Bunga Mas Lima and KA Bunga Mas Enam were built at Malaysian Marine and Heavy Engineering in Pasir Gudang, Johore.  Both ships were purchased by RMN to escort and protect Malaysian freighter ships in international waters.  They are also used to patrol and control securities in Sabah waters to enforce the ESSZONE task in Sabah.

Service history

KA Bunga Mas Lima was involved in Operation Dawn 8: Gulf of Aden in 2011, where RMN commando PASKAL was tasked to rescue the hijacked ship MV Bunga Laurel.

In the same year, KA Bunga Mas Lima together with a C-130 from Royal Malaysian Air Force (RMAF) was tasked to ferry 500 Malaysian students out of Egypt during the 2011 Egyptian revolution.

Ships of the class

References

Auxiliary ships of the Royal Malaysian Navy
Auxiliary transport ship classes